Ernan Rural District is in the Central District of Mehriz County, Yazd province, Iran. At the National Census of 2006, its population was 1,790 in 568 households. There were 1,382 inhabitants in 490 households at the following census of 2011. At the most recent census of 2016, the population of the rural district was 1,556 in 553 households. The largest of its 64 villages was Sarv, with 451 people.

References 

Mehriz County

Rural Districts of Yazd Province

Populated places in Yazd Province

Populated places in Mehriz County